Logan Couture (born March 28, 1989) is a Canadian professional ice hockey centre and captain of the San Jose Sharks of the National Hockey League (NHL). He was drafted by the Sharks ninth overall in the 2007 NHL Entry Draft, where he established himself as one of the best Stanley Cup playoff performers of his generation.

Playing career

Minor
Although he was born in Guelph, Ontario, Couture spent most of his youth growing up in Birr, near London, Ontario. He started playing minor hockey with the Lucan Irish (DD) of the Ontario Minor Hockey Association (OMHA)'s Southwestern Ontario League.

Couture led his Lucan Irish Novice team to the OMHA's Red Lobster Cup for a SW Ontario title in 1998 and an OMHA All-Ontario DD title in 1998. His Irish Atom team also won the OMHA Ontario DD title in 2001. Both of those teams also won the International Silver Stick 'C' championships. He then moved to London and played three years with the 'AAA' London Junior Knights of the Minor Hockey Alliance League, where he was a teammate of current Los Angeles Kings defenceman Drew Doughty. After his Bantam year with the Jr. Knights, Couture signed with the Junior B St. Thomas Stars.

Junior
In May 2005, Couture was drafted by the Ontario Hockey League (OHL)'s Ottawa 67's 12th overall in the 2005 OHL Priority Draft. He went on to score at a near point-per-game pace as a rookie with 64 points in 65 games in 2005–06, third in league rookie scoring behind John Tavares and Sergei Kostitsyn. The next season, in 2006–07, Couture was added to the OHL roster for the 2006 ADT Canada-Russia Challenge, replacing Jordan Staal, who was retained by the NHL's Pittsburgh Penguins. Couture was also selected to play for the Eastern Conference in the 2007 OHL All-Star Game, winning the shooting accuracy competition. After completing his second OHL season, where he improved to 78 points in 54 games, Couture was drafted ninth overall by the San Jose Sharks in the 2007 NHL Entry Draft.

Returning to the 67's in 2007–08, Couture's production dipped to 58 points in 51 games, his lowest major junior total. He had also been named to the 2008 OHL All-Star Game, but was replaced by Michael Swift of the Niagara IceDogs due to injury. Next season, in 2008–09, he finished in ninth place in league scoring with 39 goals and 48 assists for 87 points in 62 games. He also appeared in the 2009 OHL All-Star Game. Near the end of the season, he was named OHL Player of the Week on March 16, 2009, following an eight-point performance in three games.

Professional

On October 25, 2009, Couture made his NHL debut for the San Jose Sharks against the Philadelphia Flyers. He scored his first NHL goal on November 5, 2009, against Chris Osgood of the Detroit Red Wings. On April 22, 2010, Couture scored his first two playoff goals against the Colorado Avalanche in Game 5 of the first round of the 2010 Stanley Cup playoffs. He scored the game-tying goal in Game 3 in the second round against the Red Wings.

Couture was also an integral part of the success of the 2009–10 American Hockey League (AHL)'s Worcester Sharks, as he played 42 games and scored 20 goals and 33 assists for 53 points. He was a league-leader with nine game-winning goals and was named to the AHL All-Rookie Team. He was also voted onto the AHL All-Star starting line-up for AHL Team Canada, and finished the game with a goal and two assists as well as scoring a shoot-out goal.

Couture played his first full season with the Sharks in 2010–11 and finished with 32 goals (second among rookies) and 56 points (also second). He earned a nomination for the Calder Memorial Trophy for these achievements, along with the New York Islanders' Michael Grabner and the Carolina Hurricanes' Jeff Skinner, the latter of which who won the award.

On August 26, 2011, Couture signed a two-year, $5.75 million extension through to the 2013–14 season. During the 2012–13 NHL lockout, Couture played for Genève-Servette HC of the Swiss National League A. In the 2012–13 NHL season, when play resumed after the lockout, Couture played in all 48 regular season and 11 playoff games with the Sharks, leading the team in goals (21), blocks among forwards (51), game-winning goals (5), shots (151) and power play goals (7).

On July 5, 2013, the Sharks announced that the club had signed Couture to a five-year, $30 million contract extension, which would come into effect on July 1, 2014. On December 29, 2013, against the Anaheim Ducks, Couture scored his 100th career regular season goal. On January 6, 2014, the Sharks reported that Couture would have surgery to repair a wrist injury on January 8; he missed six weeks as a result.

After the 2014 seven-game playoff series loss to the eventual Stanley Cup champions Los Angeles Kings, Couture underwent surgery on his hand to repair an injury suffered in a fight with the Kings' Mike Richards in Game 6.

During the 2015–16 season, Couture suffered a broken fibula in a practice, and in the second game after he returned to play from that injury he suffered an arterial bleed which required remedial surgery. These injuries caused him to miss 30 games. However, he bolstered the San Jose Sharks line-up upon his return and helped lead the team all the way to the Stanley Cup finals, where they lost in six games to the Pittsburgh Penguins. Couture led all players in playoff assists (20) and scoring (30).

In August 2016, Couture was named to the Team Canada team for the 2016 World Cup of Hockey, replacing the Dallas Stars' Jamie Benn.

On July 1, 2018, he signed an eight-year, $64 million contract extension with the Sharks.

During the 2018–19 season, Couture amassed a personal-best 70-point season. During the 2018–19 playoffs the Sharks advanced as far as the 3rd round, losing to the eventual Stanley-Cup champion St. Louis Blues in 6 games. Despite not playing in the championship final round, Couture still led all playoff players in goals with 14, and finished third overall in playoff scoring with 20 points.

Prior to the 2019–20 season, Couture was named the Sharks captain. It was his first captaincy since his junior career with the Ottawa 67's in 2008–09. He fractured his left ankle on January 9, 2020.

On October 27, 2022, he scoed his 300th NHL goal, in a 4–3 overtime win against the Toronto Maple Leafs.

Personal life
Couture was born in Guelph, Ontario to noted Fire Fighting police officer Chet and his mother Lori. At birth, there was a NHL-future omen: The delivery-room nurse Bernadette Devorski is the mother of NHL referee Paul and NHL linesman Greg Devorski.

Couture has a younger brother by two years, Judson. He grew up in a small town called Birr, just north of London, Ontario. He attended Prince Andrew Public School and Northridge Public School for grades seven and eight, In 2003 Logan graduated from Northridge. Couture then attended A.B. Lucas Secondary School and Hillcrest High School (Ottawa).

Coming from an athletic family, his father, Chet Couture, is a retired London Fire Department Captain who played OHA senior hockey for 13 years and was a veteran Ontario Lacrosse League (OLA) and National Lacrosse League (NLL) referee, with a Metis background while his mother, Lori, a graduate of Brock University, was a physical education teacher at Lucas Secondary School. Logan's grandfather on his mother's side, the late Cy Lemon, is a Canadian Lacrosse Hall of Fame inductee. His uncle Brian Lemon is a former nine-year veteran Major Indoor Lacrosse League (MILL) pro lacrosse and OLA lacrosse player, and is the current NLL vice-president of operations. On his father's side, his late grandfather, Bob Couture, was a skilled softball pitcher and guitar player. Growing up, Couture was an exceptional athlete excelling specifically in hockey, lacrosse and baseball, where he was a two-time Honda Canada/Toronto Blue Jays "hit-run-throw" contest Canadian national champion in his age group. Couture decided at age 13 to drop the pursuit of baseball for the game of hockey. He is also a fan of the National Football League’s Buffalo Bills.

Career statistics

Regular season and playoffs
Bold indicates led league

International

Records and accomplishments
All-time NHL leader in rookie-season road game-winning-goals scored – 7
San Jose Sharks franchise leader in rookie-season goals scored – 32
First San Jose Shark to record 30 goals in his first two NHL seasons
2nd in 2010–11 NHL season rookie goals scored – 32 (behind Michael Grabner)
2nd in 2010–11 NHL season rookie points scored – 56 (behind Jeff Skinner)
Led entire NHL in points during the 2016 Stanley Cup Playoffs – 30

Awards
Named to the OHL All-Star Game in 2007, 2008* and 2009.
Named OHL Player of the Week on March 16, 2009.
Named NHL Rookie of the Month – December 2010
NHL Rookie All-Star team captain – 2010–11
Calder Memorial Trophy Finalist – 2010–11
Named to NHL All-Star Game – 2012 and 2020*
*unable to play due to injury

References

External links

1989 births
Living people
Canadian expatriate ice hockey players in Switzerland
Canadian expatriate ice hockey players in the United States
Canadian ice hockey centres
Genève-Servette HC players
Hillcrest High School (Ottawa) alumni
Ice hockey people from Ontario
National Hockey League All-Stars
National Hockey League first-round draft picks
Ottawa 67's players
San Jose Sharks draft picks
San Jose Sharks players
Sportspeople from Guelph
Sportspeople from London, Ontario
Worcester Sharks players